John Franklyn-Robbins (14 December 1924 – 21 March 2009) was an English character and voice actor.

A prolific Shakespearean actor, he trained at RADA and proceeded to work at the Manchester Library Theatre and the Bristol Old Vic early in his career. He played a diverse number of roles ranging from Ariel in The Tempest to Macduff in Macbeth. His prestigious stage career included stints in both the West End and Broadway.

He also worked for both the BBC and ITV in their early formative years and went on to appear in such classic television series as The Avengers, The Baron, Z-Cars, Special Branch, Callan, I, Claudius, Doctor Who and Star Trek: The Next Generation. He was one of only ten actors to appear in the latter two series. Films include Asylum (1972), Overlord (1975), Mrs. Dalloway (1997) and The Golden Compass (2007).

Filmography

Film
The Pumpkin Eater (1964) - Parson
Running Scared (1972) - Dean
Dracula A.D. 1972 (1972) - Minister (uncredited)
Asylum (1972) - Stebbins (segment: "The Weird Tailor")
Take Me High (1973) - Alderman
Swallows and Amazons (1974) - Young Billy
Overlord (1975) - Dad
The Brute (1977) - Solicitor
Memoirs of a Survivor (1981) - Prof. White
From a Far Country (1981) - Curate
The Plague Dogs (1982) - Williamson (voice)
The Jigsaw Man (1983) - English doctor
Lionheart (1987) - The Abbot
Dr. Jekyll and Ms. Hyde (1995) - Prof. Manning
The Adventures of Toad (1996) - Additional Voices (voice)
Emma (1996) - Mr Cole 
Mrs Dalloway (1997) - Lionel, Clarissa's Father
Lolita (1997) - (uncredited)
Santa's First Christmas (1999) - Santa Claus (voice)
The Discovery of Heaven (2001) - Onno's father 
Don't Tempt Me (2001)
Bright Young Things (2003) - Judge
Vanity Fair (2004) - Mr. Sedley
Sergeant Pepper (2004) - Gregor von Gordenthal 
The Golden Compass (2007) - Librarian (final film role)

Television
 Jude the Obscure (1971) as Phillotson 
 Budgie, as Marcus Lake (1971) episode Could Do Better 
The Onedin Line, as Giuseppe Garibaldi (1971-1978)
The Shadow of the Tower (1972) - Sir William Stanley
Doctor Who serial, Genesis of the Daleks (1975) - Time Lord
I, Claudius (1976) - Atticus
The Merchant of Venice (1980) - Antonio
The Woman in Black (1989) - Reverend Greet
The Dreamstone (1990) - The Dream Maker (voice)
Star Trek: The Next Generation episode, Preemptive Strike (1994) - Macias
A Christmas Carol (1999) - Crump
Terry Pratchett's Hogfather (2006) - Dean

External links

Obituary in The Times

1924 births
2009 deaths
English male film actors
English male television actors
Alumni of RADA